The  is a list of famous scenic sites in Japan. The 100 Landscapes or Views were selected alongside further sets of 8 Views and 25 Winning Sites in 1927, a year after Hirohito became Emperor. The selection was intended to "reflect the new taste of the new era". The nomination and voting process was sponsored by the Tokyo Nichi Nichi Shimbun and Osaka Mainichi Shimbun.

The landscapes or views are divided into eight classes (1) Coastlines (2) Lakes (3) Mountains (4) Rivers (5) Gorges (6) Waterfalls (7) Onsen (8) Plains. Many of these landscapes are now included among Japan's National Parks.

Eight Views

Twenty-Five Winning Sites

100 Views

See also
 100 Landscapes of Japan (Heisei era)
 Three Views of Japan
 100 Soundscapes of Japan
 Tourism in Japan
 Meisho

References

External links
 Ministry of the Environment - 100 View of Japan

Japanese culture
Environment of Japan
Tourism in Japan
Lists of places in Japan
Shōwa period
1927 in Japan